The Hyperion Stakes is a Perth Racing Group 3 Thoroughbred horse race held under Weight for Age conditions, over a distance of 1600 metres at Belmont Park Racecourse, Perth, Western Australia in June. Prizemoney is A$200,000.

History

Distance
 1972 - 5 furlongs (~1000 metres)
 1973 - 1000 metres
 1974 - 1200 metres
1975–1978 - 1400 metres
 1979 - 1450 metres
1980–1982 - 1400 metres
 1983 - 1500 metres
1984–2010 - 1400 metres
2011 onwards - 1600 metres

Venue
The race was initially held in March at Ascot Racecourse. In 2011 when the race was moved to Belmont Park it was held in June.

1972–2004 - Ascot Racecourse
 2005 - Belmont Park
2006–2010 - Ascot Racecourse
2011 onwards - Belmont Park

Winners

 2022 - Kaptain Kaos
 2021 - Valour Road
 2020 - Perfect Jewel
 2019 - Gatting
 2018 - Material Man
 2017 - Scales Of Justice
 2016 - Wink And A Nod
 2015 - Fuchsia Bandana
 2014 - Elite Belle
 2013 - Black Tycoon
 2012 - Luckygray
 2011 - King Kool Kat
 2010 - Marasco
 2009 - Tarzi
 2008 - Marasco
 2007 - No Questions
 2006 - Local Legend
 2005 - †Amber's Halo / Lakeside Rhythm
 2004 - Dedicated Miss
 2003 - Tribula
 2002 - Old Fashion
 2001 - Country Blazer
 2000 - Devilish Dealer
 1999 - Star System
 1998 - Willoughby
 1997 - Bar Dreamer
 1996 - Island Morn
 1995 - Jacks Or Better
 1994 - Brave Kite
 1993 - Craft Memory
 1992 - Jungle Hero
 1991 - Barrosa Boy
 1990 - Medicine Kid
 1989 - Tackle The Pak
 1988 - Fimiston
 1987 - Sky Filou
 1986 - Heron Bridge
 1985 - Jemoyn
 1984 - Heron Bridge
 1983 - Hey Cabby
 1982 - Bungler
 1981 - Swan's Pride
 1980 - Tsunami
 1979 - Asian Beau
 1978 - Junction Girl
 1977 - Alpine Wind
 1976 - Detonator
 1975 - Cambana Lad
 1974 - Cambana Lad
 1973 - Solid Gold
 1972 - St. Just

† Dead heat

See also
 List of Australian Group races
 Group races

References

Horse races in Australia
Sport in Perth, Western Australia